Michael Paul Marshall Smith (born 3 May 1965) is an English novelist, screenwriter and short story writer who also writes as Michael Marshall, M. M. Smith and Michael Rutger.

Biography
Born in Knutsford, Cheshire, Smith moved with his family at an early age to first Illinois and then Florida. When he was seven, the family moved again, this time to South Africa, and then to Australia before eventually returning home to England in 1973.

He was educated at Chigwell School, where he was in Swallows House and dated fellow pupil and future senior Sky News editor Sally Arthy, and at King's College, Cambridge, where he studied Philosophy, Social and Political Science, and became involved with the Cambridge Footlights. Under the pseudonym of Michael Rutger, he moved on to become a comedy writer and performer on the BBC Radio 4 series And Now in Colour, which has been described as a 'cult hit' and ran for two series. Between 2002 and 2004, he also co-wrote material for two series of surreal comedy Dare To Believe.

Writing career
Smith's first published story was "The Man Who Drew Cats", which won the British Fantasy Award in 1991 for "Best Short Story". He has been published in Postscripts.  His first novel, Only Forward, was published in 1994 and won the August Derleth Award for Best Novel in 1995, and then the Philip K. Dick Award in 2000. The plot involves the lead character, Stark, having to find a missing man he believes to have been kidnapped, and travel through the strange zones of his city.  In 1996 his second novel, Spares, was released, a novel in which the lead character, Jack, goes on the run with clones who are used for spare body parts for rich people, when he realises they are people with feelings.  Steven Spielberg's DreamWorks purchased the film rights for Spares, but a film was never made. When the rights lapsed, DreamWorks did produce The Island, whose plot had strong similarities to Spares, though Smith did not consider it worthwhile to pursue legal action over the similarities. He now considers it unlikely a Spares film will ever be made.

The novel The Straw Men was the first to be written under the shortened name "Michael Marshall". This change of name was originally due to the publishing of another book of the same name in 2001 by Martin J. Smith. However, Marshall Smith then decided to use the split to offer the possibility of publishing different genres of books under the two names – "modern day" novels as Michael Marshall, and horror/science fiction as Michael Marshall Smith.

On 1 September 2006, it was announced on his official website that the horror short story "Hell Hath Enlarged Herself" was in development as a feature film by Cuba Productions and Lightworks Films, financed by the UK Film Council.  Smith will be a producer and co-screenwriter on the film.

In 2012 he launched Ememess Press, a virtual small press specialising in producing electronic versions of the short fiction written under the name Michael Marshall Smith.

Intruders, a television series on BBC America, is based on Smith's 2007 novel The Intruders.

Bibliography

Novels 
 Only Forward (1994, HarperCollins) – 
 Spares (1996, HarperCollins) – 
 One of Us (1998, HarperCollins) – 
 Hannah Green and her Unfeasibly Mundane Existence (2017) – 

As M. M. Smith:

 The Servants (2007, HarperCollins) – 

As Michael Marshall:

 The Straw Men (2001, HarperCollins) – 
 The Lonely Dead (2004):
 Published in the UK by HarperCollins – 
 Released in the US under the title The Upright Man – 
 Blood of Angels (2005, HarperCollins) – 
 The Intruders (2007, HarperCollins) – 
 Bad Things (2009) – 
 Killer Move (2011) – 
 We Are Here (2013) – 

The Anomaly Series, as Michael Rutger:

 The Anomaly (2018) – 
 The Possession (2019) –

Novellas 
 The Vaccinator  (1999)

Collections 
 When God Lived in Kentish Town (1998) – a small paperback containing four stories, distributed for free by WHSmith at tube and rail stations around London and in Heathrow airport to promote the publication of One of Us. 5,000 copies were produced.
 What You Make It (1999)
 Cat Stories (2001)
 More Tomorrow & Other Stories (2003)
 This is Now (2007)
 Everything You Need (2013)
 The Best of Michael Marshall Smith (2020)

Awards

References

 Michael Marshall Smith: The Annotated Bibliography (2004) by Lavie Tidhar

External links

 Official Michael Marshall Smith Web site
 This is Now A short story at the BBC's Cult website
 LibraryThing author profile
 Interview with Michael Marshall Smith for MSN UK Tech & Gadgets
 Dark Party Review Michael Marshall Smith Interview About the Art of the Thriller

1965 births
Living people
English science fiction writers
English fantasy writers
Alumni of King's College, Cambridge
People educated at Chigwell School
People from Knutsford
English male novelists